El caballo bayo (English: The Bay Horse) is a 1966  Western film from Mexico starring Antonio Aguilar and Maricruz Olivier.

External links 
 

1966 films
1960s Spanish-language films
1966 Western (genre) films
Mexican Western (genre) films
1960s Mexican films